Last Night is a 2017 Philippine psychological drama romance film directed by Joyce Bernal, starring Piolo Pascual and Toni Gonzaga. The film follows the story of Mark and Carmina, both hopeless in their lives, intertwined by one fateful night on Jones Bridge when both of them fail to commit suicide. This film is a co-production between ABS-CBN's Star Cinema, Pascual's Spring Films, and Bernal's film production company, N2 Productions.

Synopsis 
Mark (Pascual) and Carmina (Gonzaga) find each other in a hopeless time in both their lives. He’s a businessman who lost the will to live while she’s a wide eyed young girl who gave up on life. Mark is about to jump off the Jones Bridge when Carmina calls him for help. Her blouse got stuck on her way down the river to, also, end her life. Mark helps her and they end up helping each other think of other creative ways to die. As they spend time together and in every failed attempt of leaving this world, both Mark and Carmina fall in love for each other but they can’t seem to turn away from their initial goals. Will they hold each other’s hand until their last dying breath or will love restore their faith in life?

Cast

Main Cast 
 Piolo Pascual as Mark Peter
 Toni Gonzaga as Carmina Salvador / Jennifer Reyes

Supporting Cast 
 Joey Marquez as Ricardo "Mang Rick" Reyes
 Cholo Barreto as young Rick
 Patrick Sugui as Leonard
 Blaine Mendoza as Carmina's mother
 China Juban as Mark's wife
 Margie Moran as Mark's mother
 Lou Veloso as Old man in LRT Station

Production

Development 
Actress and writer Bela Padilla wrote the story for this film, as well as the screenplay with Neil Arce.

Production 
Boy Yñiguez, the cinematographer of the highest-grossing Filipino independent film Kita Kita was also the cinematographer of this film.

Principal photography was done at several places in Manila. Among the shooting locations in the city are Jones Bridge, Luneta Hotel, as well as in the Casa Manila restaurant.

Release 
The film was released exclusively in the Philippines on September 27, 2017.

References 

2017 films
2017 drama films
2010s psychological drama films
2017 romance films
Films directed by Joyce Bernal
Philippine psychological drama films
Philippine romantic drama films